Events in the year 1893 in Brazil.

Incumbents

Federal government
 President: Marshal Floriano Peixoto
 Vice-President: vacant

Governors 
 Alagoas: Gabino Besuoro
 Amazonas: Eduardo Gonçalves Ribeiro
 Bahia: Rodrigues Lima
 Ceará: Antônio Nogueira Accioli
 Goiás:
 until July 1: Antônio Caiado
 from July 1: José Inácio Xavier de Brito
 Maranhão:
 until October 27: Alfredo Martins
 from October 27: Casimiro Vieira Jr
 Mato Grosso: 
 Minas Gerais: Afonso Pena
 Pará: Lauro Sodré
 Paraíba: Álvaro Lopes Machado
 Paraná: Francisco Xavier da Silva, then Vicente Machado da Silva Lima
 Pernambuco: Alexandre José Barbosa Lima
 Piauí: Coriolano de Carvalho e Silva
 Rio Grande do Norte: Pedro de Albuquerque Maranhão
 Rio Grande do Sul: 
 until September 27: Vitoriano Ribeiro Carneiro Monteiro
 from September 27: Fernando Fernandes Abbott
 Santa Catarina:
 São Paulo: 
 Sergipe:

Vice governors 
 Rio de Janeiro: 
 Rio Grande do Norte:
 São Paulo:

Events
September – Revolta da Armada launched by Royalist admiral Custódio José de Melo
November – beginning of the Federalist Revolution

Births
January 19 – Magda Tagliaferro, pianist of French parentage (died 1986)
May 16 – Ronald de Carvalho, poet and diplomat (died 1935)
October 9 – Mário de Andrade, poet, novelist, musicologist, art historian and critic, and photographer (died 1945)

Deaths
July 13 – William Hutchinson Norris, founder of the city of Americana, São Paulo (born 1800)

References

 
1890s in Brazil
Years of the 19th century in Brazil
Brazil
Brazil